Stan Blake (born November 8, 1954) is an American railroad conductor and politician, and a former Wyoming state legislator. A member of the Democratic Party, Blake represented the 39th district in the Wyoming House of Representatives from 2007 to 2021. In 2020,  he was defeated by fellow Union Pacific employee and Green River resident Marshall Burt, a Libertarian.

Blake is employed by the Union Pacific Railroad and lives in Green River, Wyoming, with his wife, Terri June Blake.

References

External links
Wyoming State Legislature - Representative Stan Blake official WY House website
Project Vote Smart - Representative Stan Blake (WY) profile
Follow the Money - Stan Blake
2006 campaign contributions

Democratic Party members of the Wyoming House of Representatives
1954 births
Living people
21st-century American politicians
Conductor (rail)
People from Green River, Wyoming